Tân An is the capital city of Long An Province, Vietnam. Tân An may also refer to several other places in Vietnam, including:

Tân An, Cần Thơ, a ward of Ninh Kiều District
Tân An, Bình Dương, a ward of Thủ Dầu Một
Tân An, Đắk Lắk, a ward of Buôn Ma Thuột
Tân An, Quảng Nam, a ward of Hội An
Tân An, Bình Thuận, a ward of La Gi
Tân An, Quảng Ninh, a ward of Quảng Yên
Tân An, Yên Bái, a ward of Nghĩa Lộ
Tân An, Bắc Giang, a township of Yên Dũng District
Tân An, An Giang, a commune of Tân Châu, An Giang
Tân An, Đồng Nai, a commune of Vĩnh Cửu District
Tân An, Gia Lai, a commune of Đắk Pơ District
Tân An, Hải Dương, a commune of Thanh Hà District
Tân An, Kiên Giang, a commune of Tân Hiệp District
Tân An, Lào Cai, a commune of Văn Bàn District
Tân An, Nghệ An, a commune of Tân Kỳ District
Tân An, Trà Vinh, a commune of Càng Long District
Tân An, Tuyên Quang, a commune of Chiêm Hóa District
Former Tân An Province in South Vietnam, now part of Long An Province

See also
Tân Ân (disambiguation)